Hans Kraay may refer:

 Hans Kraay Sr. (1936–2017), former Dutch footballer 
 Hans Kraay Jr. (born 1958), former Dutch footballer